The 2020–21 Belgian First Division A was the 118th season of top-tier football in Belgium. As part of a proposal by the Jupiler Pro League's board of directors accepted by the General Assembly on 15 May 2020, the 2020–21 season would involve shortened playoffs due to the COVID-19 pandemic. Only the top four teams would play for the title, while teams five through eight would play for the remaining ticket into Europe. The league fixtures were announced on 8 July 2020.

Team changes
Waasland-Beveren were originally relegated to the Belgian First Division B, as they were the bottom-placed team when the 2019–20 Belgian First Division A stopped prematurely due to the COVID-19 pandemic. However, following legal proceedings, they remained in the top-flight, and instead, the league was expanded to 18 teams, with both OH Leuven and Beerschot being promoted (normally only one of them would have gained promotion). Technically, under its current form and owners, Beerschot will make its debut in the top tier of Belgian football, although in reality two teams with the same identity have played at the top level: Beerschot VAC (81 seasons, last in 1990–91) and Beerschot AC (until its bankruptcy at the end of the 2012–13 season, and known as Germinal Beerschot from 1999 until 2011). OH Leuven returned to the top tier after an absence of four seasons, when they dropped to the last place on the ultimate matchday of the 2015–16 season.

Format change
With now 18 instead of 16 teams, the format has changed somewhat. While the season still starts with an initial round-robin phase in which all teams play each other twice, the end of season play-offs have been shortened temporarily and for the 2020–21 and 2021–22 seasons only. The title playoffs will now only be played by the top four teams (instead of six) and the Europa play-offs will now be played by the teams finishing fifth through eight (instead of all teams finishing below 6th). As a result, for all teams finishing below 8th, the season will be over upon completion of the round-robin phase, with the team in last position being relegated. One exception is the team finishing in 17th position, as this team will play a promotion-relegation play off against the 2nd-place finisher in the 2020–21 Belgian First Division B, with the winner playing in the 2021–22 Belgian First Division A.

Teams

Stadiums and locations

Number of teams by provinces

Personnel and kits

Managerial changes
<onlyinclude>

<onlyinclude>

Regular season

League table

Results

Play-offs

Play-Off I

The points obtained during the regular season were halved (and rounded up) before the start of the playoff. As a result, the teams started with the following points before the playoff: Club Brugge 38, Antwerp 30, Anderlecht 29 and Genk 28.

Play-Off II
The points obtained during the regular season were halved (and rounded up) before the start of the playoff. As a result, the teams started with the following points before the playoff: Oostende 27, Standard 25, Gent 25 and Mechelen 24. The points of Oostende and Gent were rounded up, therefore in case of any ties on points at the end of the playoffs, the half point will be deducted for these teams.

European competition play-offs
Originally, the fourth-placed team of the play-offs I (or third-placed team if the regular season winners finish fourth) and the first-placed team of the play-offs II would play two home-and-away matches to determine the Europa Conference League play-off winner, which would qualify for the second qualifying round of the 2021–22 UEFA Europa Conference League. However, since Genk, winners of the 2020–21 Belgian Cup, finished in the regular season top four and qualified for play-offs I, this guaranteed that all four teams of play-offs I would qualify for European competitions. As a result, the play-off final was not played, and the first-placed team of the play-offs II, KAA Gent, qualified for the second qualifying round of the 2021–22 UEFA Europa Conference League.

Promotion-Relegation play-off
The team finishing in 17th place competes in a two-legged match with the runner-up of the 2020–21 Belgian First Division B, with the aggregate winner to play in the 2021–22 Belgian First Division A, while the losing team will take part in the 2021–22 Belgian First Division B.

On 11 April 2021, Seraing from the Belgian First Division B qualified for the promotion-relegation playoff as a loss by Lommel against Union SG meant Seraing could no longer be overtaken for second place. On 8 May 2021, Seraing was promoted to the 2021–22 Belgian First Division A after a 6–3 aggregate win in the two-legged series and Waasland-Beveren was relegated to the 2021–22 Belgian First Division B.

Seraing won 6–3 on aggregate.

Season statistics

Top scorers

Top assists

Awards

Annual awards

Notes

References

External links
  Jupiler Pro League official website

2020-21
2020–21 in European association football leagues
1
Belgium